ALMA is a Spanish-language lifestyle magazine published in the United States for the Hispanic community. The magazine was founded in 2005. It focuses mainly on culture, fashion and politics. At the beginning It was published in Argentina ten times a year. The magazine had its headquarters for production and content development in Buenos Aires and had also an office for marketing and advertising sales in Miami, Florida. Later it began to be published by  Alma Magazine Corp in Miami. Its target audience is upscale Hispanic adults.

References

External links
 

2005 establishments in Florida
Lifestyle magazines published in the United States
Magazines established in 2005
Magazines published in Florida
Magazines published in Buenos Aires
Mass media in Miami
Monthly magazines published in the United States
Political magazines published in the United States
Spanish-language magazines
Spanish-language mass media in Florida
Ten times annually magazines